The Most Reverend Dr. Thomas Nulty or Thomas McNulty (1818-1898) was born to a farming family in Fennor, Oldcastle, Co. Meath, on 7 July 1818, and died in office as the Irish Roman Catholic Bishop of Meath on Christmas Eve, 1898.

Biography
Nulty was educated at Gilson School, Oldcastle, County Meath, St. Finians, Navan Seminary and Maynooth College. He was ordained in 1846. Nulty was a cleric during the Great Famine. During the course of his first pastoral appointment, he officiated at an average 11 funerals of famine victims (mostly children or the aged) a day, and in 1848 he described a large-scale eviction of 700 tenants in the diocese, thought to have been near Lough Sheelin, a freshwater lough at a meeting point of Counties Westmeath, Meath and Cavan.

Nulty rose to become the Most Reverend Bishop of Meath and was known as a fierce defender of the tenant rights of Irish tenant farmers throughout the 34 years that he served in that office, from 1864 to 1898. Nulty was in agreement with the economic ideas of the progressive reformer Henry George. Nulty read George's book Progress and Poverty multiple times and agreed with every word. Henry George even said that 'Georgism' could just as well be known as 'Nultyism'.

Thomas Nulty is famed for his 1881 tract Back to the Land, wherein he makes the case for land reform of the Irish land tenure system. Nulty was a friend and supporter of the Irish nationalist Charles Stewart Parnell until Parnell's divorce crisis in 1889.

Dr. Thomas Nulty, who had attended the First Vatican Council in 1870, said his last mass on 21 December 1898.

References

External links
Catholic Hierarchy
Copy of 31 December 1881 letter from Thomas Nulty to the Dublin Freeman newspaper

1818 births
1898 deaths
19th-century Roman Catholic bishops in Ireland
Roman Catholic bishops of Meath
Alumni of St Patrick's College, Maynooth
Irish land reform activists
People from County Meath
People educated at St Finian's College